Charles Lively may refer to:

 Charles Lively (athlete) (1893–1971), British long and triple jumper
 Charles Elson Lively (1890–1968), American sociologist
 Charles Lively (labor spy) (1887–1962), American labor spy